Events in the year 1983 in Cyprus.

Incumbents 

 President: Demetris Christofias
 President of the Parliament: Yiannakis Omirou

Events 
Ongoing – Cyprus dispute

 13 February – Spyros Kyprianou of the Democratic Party (and also supported by AKEL) won presidential elections, receiving 56.5% of the vote. Voter turnout was 95.0%.

Deaths

References 

 
1980s in Cyprus
Years of the 21st century in Cyprus
Cyprus
Cyprus
Cyprus